The Dynamic Sport Magnum is a Polish single-place, paraglider that was designed by Wojtek Pierzyński and produced by Dynamic Sport of Kielce. It is now out of production.

Design and development
The aircraft was designed as an intermediate glider.

Operational history
Reviewer Noel Bertrand described the Magnum in a 2003 review as priced very competitively.

Specifications (Magnum)

References

Magnum
Paragliders